Temeliyeh (also Romanized as Temelīyeh, Tamalīyēh, Tamīleh, Temīleh, Temlīyeh, and Tomelīyeh) is a village in Firuzabad Rural District, Firuzabad District, Selseleh County, Lorestan Province, Iran. At the 2006 census, its population was 1,340, in 268 families.

References 

Towns and villages in Selseleh County